The Clarkson Golden Knights women's ice hockey program represented Clarkson University during the 2015–16 NCAA Division I women's ice hockey season. The Golden Knights entered the season as the defending ECAC regular season champions.

The Golden Knights finished second in the ECAC. In the ECAC tournament they advanced to the championship game before falling to regular season champion Quinnipiac. Their performance was still enough to earn a fourth-straight at-large the NCAA tournament bid. In the quarterfinals, they upset Quinnipiac, sending them to their second ever Frozen Four. In the semifinals, they fell in overtime to an undefeated and untied Boston College team.

Offseason

Recruiting

Roster

Schedule

|-
!colspan=12 style=""| Regular Season

|-
!colspan=12 style=""| ECAC Hockey Tournament

|-
!colspan=12 style=""| NCAA Tournament

Awards and honors

 Erin Ambrose – Second Team All-USCHO.com, ECAC Hockey All-Tournament Team, ECAC Hockey First Team All-Star, ECAC Hockey Player of the Week (1/12), ECAC Hockey weekly Honor Roll (3/2)
 Genevieve Bannon – ECAC Hockey weekly Honor Roll (11/3, 1/19, 1/26, 2/21)
 Renata Fast – ECAC Hockey Third Team All-Star
 Loren Gabel – ECAC Hockey All-Rookie Team, ECAC Hockey Rookie of the Month (February), ECAC Hockey Rookie of the Week (2/21), ECAC Hockey weekly Honor Roll (10/27, 11/17, 11/23, 1/19)
 Savannah Harmon – ECAC Hockey weekly Honor Roll (10/13)
 Olivia Howe – ECAC Hockey Second Team All-Star, ECAC Hockey Player of the Week (10/20, 2/1), ECAC Hockey weekly Honor Roll (11/17, 11/23)
 McKenzie Johnson – ECAC Hockey weekly Honor Roll (10/13)
 Shannon MacAulay – ECAC Hockey All-Tournament Team
 Kelly Mariani – ECAC Hockey weekly Honor Roll (10/20, 2/1)
 Rhyen McGill – ECAC Hockey Rookie of the Week (10/13, 1/26), ECAC Hockey weekly Honor Roll (10/6)
 Cayley Mercer – Third Team All-USCHO.com, ECAC Hockey First Team All-Star, ECAC Hockey Player of the Month (October), ECAC Hockey Player of the Week (10/6, 10/27)
 Josiane Pozzebon – ECAC Hockey weekly Honor Roll (10/20, 2/1)
 Shea Tiley – ECAC Hockey Goaltender of the Month (October), ECAC Hockey Goaltender of the Week (10/20), ECAC Hockey weekly Honor Roll (10/6, 10/27, 11/3, 11/17, 11/23, 1/12, 1/19, 1/26, 2/1, 2/21, 3/2)
 Cassidy Vinkle – ECAC Hockey weekly Honor Roll (1/12)

References

Clarkson
Clarkson Golden Knights women's ice hockey seasons